Gwahae-dong is a dong, neighbourhood of Gangseo-gu in Seoul, South Korea. It is a legal dong (법정동 ) managed by its administrative dong (행정동 ), Gonghang-dong.

The Aviation and Railway Accident Investigation Board (ARAIB) has its FDR/CVR Analysis and Wreckage Laboratory on the property of Gimpo International Airport in Gwahae-dong.

See also 

Administrative divisions of South Korea

References

External links
Gangseo-gu official website
 Gangseo-gu map at the Gangseo-gu official website
 Resident offices of Gangseo-gu

Neighbourhoods of Gangseo District, Seoul